Murri may refer to:

People
Augusto Murri (1841-1932), Italian physician
Romolo Murri (1870-1944), Italian politician and ecclesiastic
Serafino Murri (b. 1966), Italian film critic, screenwriter, and film director

Culture
Murri people, Aboriginal Australians of Queensland and northwestern New South Wales

Geography
Murri, an alternative spelling for Murree, a city and resort in Pakistan
The Murri River in Colombia

Cuisine
Murri (condiment), a condiment used in Arab cuisine

Sports
Murri Rugby League Carnival, an annual rugby league carnival in Queensland, Australia
Murri Rugby League Team, a rugby league team in Australia

Other
The Murri Affair, an alternative name in international release for Drama of the Rich

See also
Marri, a Baloch tribe in Pakistan
Muri (disambiguation)